Pulvinaria is a scale insect genus in the family Coccidae. The type species is Coccus vitis Linnaeus.

Species 

 Pulvinaria acericola 
 Pulvinaria aestivalis 
 Pulvinaria aethiopica 
 Pulvinaria alboinducta 
 Pulvinaria aligarhensis 
 Pulvinaria ampelopsidis 
 Pulvinaria amygdali 
 Pulvinaria aonoae 
 Pulvinaria araliae 
 Pulvinaria areolata 
 Pulvinaria aurantii 
 Pulvinaria avasthii 
 Pulvinaria bambusicola 
 Pulvinaria bigeloviae 
 Pulvinaria borchsenii 
 Pulvinaria brachiungualis 
 Pulvinaria brevicornis 
 Pulvinaria cacao 
 Pulvinaria callosa 
 Pulvinaria carieri 
 Pulvinaria cestri 
 Pulvinaria chrysanthemi 
 Pulvinaria citricola 
 Pulvinaria claviseta 
 Pulvinaria coccolobae 
 Pulvinaria cockerelli 
 Pulvinaria convexa 
 Pulvinaria corni 
 Pulvinaria costata 
 Pulvinaria crassispina 
 Pulvinaria decorata 
 Pulvinaria delottoi 
 Pulvinaria dendrophthorae 
 Pulvinaria depressa 
 Pulvinaria dicrostachys 
 Pulvinaria dodonaeae 
 Pulvinaria drimyswinteri 
 Pulvinaria durantae 
 Pulvinaria ellesmerensis 
 Pulvinaria elongata 
 Pulvinaria enkianthi 
 Pulvinaria ericicola 
 Pulvinaria eryngii 
 Pulvinaria eugeniae 
 Pulvinaria euonymi 
 Pulvinaria ferrisi 
 Pulvinaria ficus 
 Pulvinaria flava 
 Pulvinaria flavescens 
 Pulvinaria floccifera 
 Pulvinaria fraxini 
 Pulvinaria fujisana 
 Pulvinaria gamazumii 
 Pulvinaria glacialis 
 Pulvinaria globosa 
 Pulvinaria goethei 
 Pulvinaria gossypii 
 Pulvinaria grabhami 
 Pulvinaria grandis 
 Pulvinaria hakonensis 
 Pulvinaria hazeae 
 Pulvinaria hemiacantha 
 Pulvinaria horii 
 Pulvinaria hydrangeae 
 Pulvinaria iceryi 
 Pulvinaria idesiae 
 Pulvinaria inconspiqua 
 Pulvinaria indica 
 Pulvinaria ixorae 
 Pulvinaria juglandii 
 Pulvinaria justaserpentina 
 Pulvinaria katsurae
 Pulvinaria kirgisica
 Pulvinaria kuwacola 
 Pulvinaria lineolatae 
 Pulvinaria loralaiensis 
 Pulvinaria mammeae 
 Pulvinaria marmorata 
 Pulvinaria maskelli 
 Pulvinaria merwei 
 Pulvinaria minuscula 
 Pulvinaria minuta 
 Pulvinaria mkuzei 
 Pulvinaria myricariae 
 Pulvinaria neocellulosa 
 Pulvinaria nishigaharae 
 Pulvinaria obscura 
 Pulvinaria occidentalis 
 Pulvinaria ochnaceae 
 Pulvinaria okitsuensis 
 Pulvinaria ornata 
 Pulvinaria oyamae 
 Pulvinaria paranaensis 
 Pulvinaria peninsularis 
 Pulvinaria peregrina 
 Pulvinaria persicae 
 Pulvinaria phaiae 
 Pulvinaria photiniae 
 Pulvinaria platensis 
 Pulvinaria plucheae 
 Pulvinaria polygonata 
 Pulvinaria populeti 
 Pulvinaria portblairensis 
 Pulvinaria pruni 
 Pulvinaria psidii 
 Pulvinaria pulchra 
 Pulvinaria randiae 
 Pulvinaria regalis 
 Pulvinaria rehi 
 Pulvinaria rhizophila 
 Pulvinaria rhoicina 
 Pulvinaria rhois 
 Pulvinaria saccharia 
 Pulvinaria salicicola 
 Pulvinaria salicis 
 Pulvinaria salicorniae 
 Pulvinaria satoi 
 Pulvinaria savescui 
 Pulvinaria sericea 
 Pulvinaria shinjii 
 Pulvinaria simplex 
 Pulvinaria simulans 
 Pulvinaria sorghicola 
 Pulvinaria subterranea 
 Pulvinaria taiwana 
 Pulvinaria tapiae 
 Pulvinaria tenuivalvata 
 Pulvinaria terrestris 
 Pulvinaria tessellata 
 Pulvinaria thompsoni 
 Pulvinaria tomentosa 
 Pulvinaria torreyae 
 Pulvinaria tremulae 
 Pulvinaria tromelini 
 Pulvinaria tuberculata 
 Pulvinaria tyleri 
 Pulvinaria uapacae 
 Pulvinaria urbicola 
 Pulvinaria vangueriae 
 Pulvinaria viburni 
 Pulvinaria vini 
 Pulvinaria vinifera
 Pulvinaria vitis

References

Sternorrhyncha genera
Coccidae